The European School, Munich (ESM) is one of thirteen European Schools and one of three in Germany. First established in 1977, it moved to its current location in Neuperlach, a district in the south-east of Munich, in the state of Bavaria in 1981. The ESM was principally established to serve the schooling needs of children of the staff of the European Patent Office (EPO) — the executive body of the European Patent Organisation.  However, enrolment is open to other prospective students. The school offers the European Baccalaureate as its secondary leaving qualification.

Notable alumni 
Bas Kast, German author
Christian Keysers, German neuroscientist
Peter Pomerantsev, British journalist and TV producer

Notable former staff 
 Tom Høyem, school Director (1994-2000)

See also 
European School
European Schools

References

External links 
 

Educational institutions established in 1977
Munich
International schools in Bavaria
1977 establishments in West Germany
Ramersdorf-Perlach